The 1981 South Pacific Mini Games were held at Honiara in the Solomon Islands from 8–16 July 1981. It was the first edition of the South Pacific Mini Games.

Participating countries
Fifteen Pacific nations participated in the Games:

Sports
Five sports were contested at the 1981 South Pacific Mini Games:

Final medal table
New Caledonia topped the medal count:

See also
Athletics at the 1981 South Pacific Mini Games

Notes
 For the 1981 Mini Games, almost 600 contestants were expected to take part.

References

Pacific Games by year
Pacific Games
P
 
1981 in Solomon Islands sport
International sports competitions hosted by the Solomon Islands
Pacific Mini Games